The 2013 season was Vålerenga's 12th season back in the Tippeligaen since their promotion in 2000. It is their first season with Kjetil Rekdal as manager and they finished the season in 11th place in the Tippeligaen and they reached the Quarter-finals of the cup losing to Rosenborg.

Squad

Transfers

Winter

In:

Out:

Summer

In:

Out:

Competitions

Friendlies

Tippeligaen

Results summary

Results by round

Results

Table

Norwegian Cup

Squad statistics

Appearances and goals

|-
|colspan="14"|Players away from Vålerenga on loan:
|-
|colspan="14"|Players who left Vålerenga during the season:

|}

Goal scorers

Disciplinary record

Notes

References

Vålerenga Fotball seasons
Valerenga